Ferula assa-foetida is a species of Ferula endemic to Southern Iran. It is the source of asafoetida, but its production is confined to Southern Iran, especially the area near Lar.

Outside its native range, other asafoetida-producing species are often misidentified as F. assa-foetida. For example, F. foetida is mistaken for F. assa-foetida in Flora of the U.S.S.R. and Flora of Pakistan. In a molecular phylogenetic study, all the plant samples of F. assa-foetida collected in Central Iran were clustered with other species such as F. alliacea and F. gabrielii instead of with the verified sample of F. assa-foetida collected in Southern Iran. Chemical analyses of asafoetida samples obtained from local markets also showed that asafoetida-producing species in Eastern Iran were F. lutensis, F. foetida, F. alliacea, etc., instead of F. assa-foetida.

F. pseudalliacea and F. rubricaulis are endemic to western and southwestern Iran and are sometimes considered conspecific with F. assa-foetida.

References 

assa-foetida
Endemic flora of Iran